The list of fantasy novels has been divided into the following three parts:

 List of fantasy novels (A–H)
 List of fantasy novels (I–R)
 List of fantasy novels (S–Z)

Novels